Alexander Peroni (born 27 November 1999) is an Australian racing driver, currently competing in the 2022 European Le Mans Series for Algarve Pro Racing. He has competed in the 2021 Indy Lights Series for Carlin Motorsport, and in the 2020 FIA Formula 3 Championship for Campos Racing team. Peroni is the 2016 Challenge Monoplace champion.

Career

Formula 4 
In 2015, Peroni graduated from kart racing to single-seaters, participating in the Italian F4 Championship with Torino Squadra Corse, finishing fourteenth overall and securing two second place podium finishes at Imola and Misano.

Formula Renault 
In 2016, Peroni continued his collaboration with TS Corse, competing in Formula Renault 2.0 machinery in the V de V Challenge Monoplace. He dominated the season and won 14 from 21 races to clinch the championship title.

For 2017, Peroni switched to Formula Renault Eurocup but decided to move to the Fortec Motorsport team. He won race 2 at Pau and finished the season 10th in the drivers' standings ahead of his teammates Aleksey Korneev, Najiy Razak and Frank Bird.

In 2018 he moved to MP Motorsport to again compete in the Formula Renault Eurocup, where he finished 9th in the championship, with the highlights being a 1st and 2nd place in the two Monaco events. He also won both races of the first round of the NEC series on the streets of Pau, which was his only NEC event of the year.

FIA Formula 3

2019 
For 2019, he moved to the FIA Formula 3 Championship with Campos Racing.

In the 2019 Italian feature race at Monza, a week after the crash which took Anthoine Hubert’s life and put Juan Manuel Correa in a coma, Peroni had a serious crash after hitting a "sausage kerb" at the Parabolica which sent him into a somersault into the tyre barriers, finally coming to a stop at the catch fence. He walked away from the crash, but was later diagnosed with a broken vertebra. On medical advice Peroni missed the remainder of the season, along with the Macau Grand Prix. He finished the 2019 season in 20th place in the driver standings with five points - the only points scored by Campos that season.

2020 
After recovering from the injuries sustained in his crash at Monza, Peroni returned to compete in FIA Formula 3 with Campos Racing at the delayed start of the 2020 season. At pre-season testing in Bahrain, in April 2020, he scored the fastest overall time. In the first race of the 2020 season at the Red Bull Ring in Austria, he secured his first FIA F3 podium, with a third place finish. Peroni went on to secure a further two podiums in the season: third place in Race 2 at Silverstone, and second place in Race 2 in Barcelona.

At the end of the 2020 FIA Formula 3 Championship, Peroni took 10th place in the final driver standings, with a total of 64 points. As in 2019, his points were the only ones scored by Campos that season.

In recognition of his success in the 2020 FIA Formula 3 Championship, Peroni was awarded the 2020 Peter Brock Medal. Previous winners of the medal, named after Australian motorsport icon Peter Brock, include Mark Webber and Craig Lowndes.
Peroni departed Formula 3 at the end of the season.

Indy Lights 
At the end of 2020, Peroni announced a move from FIA Formula 3 to the North American based series Indy Lights. UK-based team Carlin signed Peroni in a one-year deal for the 2021 season, marking their own return to the Indy Lights series after a two-year break.

Peroni scored his only Indy Lights podium with a third-place finish in the second race at Indianapolis Motor Speedway in May 2021.

In September 2021, Peroni announced that he would be ending his Indy Lights season early, and would not be competing in the final three rounds, instead returning to Europe to focus on opportunities there.

Euroformula Open 
Peroni signed with Drivex School to compete in the 2022 Euroformula Open Championship. However after the first round, Peroni unexpectedly stopped his campaign.

European Le Mans 
In 2022, Peroni signed with Algave Pro Racing to compete in the 2022 European Le Mans Series with fellow Australian James Allen and American John Falb as teammates. The trio competed in the LMP2 Pro-Am class.

GT World Challenge Europe 
In 2023, Peroni shifted focus from prototypes to GT3 racing, competing for GetSpeed Performance in the GT World Challenge Europe Endurance Cup. Peroni's co-drivers were Patrick Assenheimer and Florian Scholze, and the team competed in the Bronze Cup class.

Karting record

Karting career summary

Racing record

Career summary

† As Peroni was a guest driver, he was ineligible for points.
‡ Peroni was ineligible for points from the second round onwards.
* Season still in progress.

Complete Italian F4 Championship results 
(key) (Races in bold indicate pole position) (Races in italics indicate fastest lap)

Complete V de V Challenge Monoplace results 
(key) (Races in bold indicate pole position) (Races in italics indicate fastest lap)

Complete Formula Renault Eurocup results
(key) (Races in bold indicate pole position) (Races in italics indicate fastest lap)

† As Peroni was a guest driver, he was ineligible for points.

Complete FIA Formula 3 Championship results
(key) (Races in bold indicate pole position; races in italics indicate points for the fastest lap of top ten finishers)

* - 10 second time penalty for avoidable contact dropping Peroni from 13th to 26th.

American open-wheel racing results 
(key)

Indy Lights

Complete Euroformula Open Championship results 
(key) (Races in bold indicate pole position; races in italics indicate points for the fastest lap of top ten finishers)

Complete European Le Mans Series results
(key) (Races in bold indicate pole position; results in italics indicate fastest lap)

Complete GT World Challenge Europe results

GT World Challenge Europe Endurance Cup 
(Races in bold indicate pole position) (Races in italics indicate fastest lap)

* Season still in progress.

References

External links
 
 
 Racing Reference profile

1999 births
Living people
Racing drivers from Tasmania
Italian F4 Championship drivers
Formula Renault Eurocup drivers
FIA Formula 3 Championship drivers
Indy Lights drivers
MP Motorsport drivers
Campos Racing drivers
Formula Renault 2.0 NEC drivers
Euroformula Open Championship drivers
European Le Mans Series drivers
Carlin racing drivers
Drivex drivers
Fortec Motorsport drivers